Chiara Consonni (born 24 June 1999) is an Italian racing cyclist, who currently rides for UCI Women's Continental Team .

Her older brother Simone Consonni is also a professional cyclist.

Major results

Road

2017
 3rd Diamond Tour
2018
 3rd Diamond Tour
 7th Omloop van Borsele
2019 
 1st Stage 5 Boels Ladies Tour
 3rd Gran Premio Bruno Beghelli
2020
 2nd Grand Prix d'Isbergues
 3rd GP de Plouay
2021
 1st Ronde de Mouscron
 1st Vuelta a la Comunitat Valenciana
 1st Grand Prix de Plumelec-Morbihan
2022
 1st Dwars door Vlaanderen
 1st Dwars door de Westhoek
 1st Stage 9 Giro d'Italia
 2nd Le Samyn
 2nd GP Oetingen
 2nd Scheldeprijs
 2nd Gran Premio della Liberazione
 4th Nokere Koerse
 7th Ronde van Drenthe
 7th Classic Brugge–De Panne
 7th Drentse Acht van Westerveld
 7th Ronde de Mouscron

Track

2016 
 1st  Team pursuit, UCI World Junior Championships
 1st  Team pursuit, UEC European Junior Championships
 2nd Team sprint, National Junior Championships
2017 
 UCI World Junior Championships
1st  Team pursuit
1st  Madison (with Letizia Paternoster)
3rd  Points
 UEC European Junior Championships
1st  Team pursuit
1st  Madison (with Letizia Paternoster)
2018 
 National Championships
2nd Madison (with Marta Cavalli)
3rd Omnium
2019 
 UCI World Cup
3rd Team pursuit, Glasgow
3rd Madison (with Vittoria Guazzini), Hong Kong
2020 
 UEC European Under-23 Championships
1st  Team pursuit
1st  Madison (with Martina Fidanza)
2022
 1st  Team pursuit, UCI World Championships

References

External links
 

1999 births
Living people
Italian female cyclists
Italian track cyclists
People from Ponte San Pietro
Cyclists from the Province of Bergamo
UCI Track Cycling World Champions (women)
21st-century Italian women